Mogoșoaia is a commune in Muntenia, Romania.

Mogoșoaia may also refer to:

 Sinking of the Mogoșoaia, 1989 ferry disaster
 Mogoșoaia River, a tributary of the Doftana River in Romania
 Mogoşoaia Stadium, a football stadium in Romania which is part of the National Football Centre
 Mogoșoaia Palace, situated about 10 kilometres from Bucharest, Romania

See also 
 Mogoș
 Mogoșani
 Mogoșești (disambiguation)